PiggyBac Transposable Element Derived 5 is an enzyme that in humans is encoded by the PGBD5 gene. PGBD5 is a DNA transposase related to the ancient PiggyBac transposase first identified in the cabbage looper moth, Trichoplusia ni. The gene is believed to have been domesticated over 500 million years ago in the common ancestor of cephalochordates and vertebrates. The putative catalytic triad of the protein composed of three aspartic acid residues is conserved among PGBD5-like genes through evolution, and is distinct from other PiggyBac-like genes. PGBD5 has been shown to be able to transpose DNA in a sequence-specific, cut-and-paste fashion. PGBD5 has also been proposed to mediate site-specific DNA rearrangements in human tumors.

Human PGBD5 can mobilize the insect PiggyBac transposons in human cell culture.

Expression in the brain
In mature mice brain tissue PGBD5 is found primarily in regions of the olfactory bulb, hippocampus, and cerebellum. In embryonic mice brain tissue PGBD5 is found not only in the medial pallium and prepontine isthmus, which are embryonic brain areas that give rise to the development of the hippocampus and cerebellum but also in areas in the embryonic brain that give rise to the hypothalamus and medulla.

Disease Associations

PGBD5 is expressed in the majority of human pediatric solid tumors. It's upregulated in sporadic Creutzfeldt-Jakob disease. PGBD5 is associated with frontotemporal dementia, where it gets most expressed in neurons, followed by ogliodendrocytes, mature astrocytes, fetal astrocytes, endothelial cells and then microglia/macrophages.

References 

Genes on human chromosome 1
Mobile genetic elements
Enzymes